GT2 or GT-2 may refer to:

FIA GT2 European Championship
One of several categories in the FIA GT Championship
Group GT2, former name of LM GTE class.
SRO GT2, a class of Grand tourer racing cars aimed at gentleman drivers and maintained by the SRO Motorsports Group
Gran Turismo 2, a racing game for the PlayStation video game console
The Porsche 911 GT2
Nickname for New Meadowlands Stadium
Green-Tweed GT-2, an American single seat glider
Denel GT-2, a South African 90mm cannon developed by Denel Land Systems
Gemini 2 (NASA Project Gemini), flight code "GT-2" from the alternate name Gemini-Titan 2
A type of toothed belt used for CNC and 3D-printing machines